Meike Maria Elisabeth Akveld is a Swiss mathematician and textbook author, whose professional interests include knot theory, symplectic geometry, and mathematics education. She is a tenured senior scientist and lecturer in the mathematics and teacher education group in the Department of Mathematics at ETH Zurich. She is also the organizer of the Mathematical Kangaroo competitions in Switzerland, and president of the Association Kangourou sans Frontières, a French-based international society devoted to the popularization of mathematics.

Education
Akveld earned a bachelor's degree from the University of Warwick and took Part III of the Mathematical Tripos at the University of Cambridge. She completed her Ph.D. at ETH Zurich in 2000, with the dissertation Hofer geometry for Lagrangian loops, a Legendrian knot and a travelling wave jointly supervised by Dietmar Salamon and Leonid Polterovich.

Books
Akveld's mathematics books include:
 Canonical metrics in Kähler geometry (by Tian Gang, based on notes taken by Akveld, Birkhäuser, 2000)
 Knoten in der Mathematik: Ein Spiel mit Schnüren, Bildern und Formeln (Knots in mathematics: A game with strings, pictures and formulas, in German, Orell Füssli, 2007)
 Hofer geometry for Lagrangian loops: And a Legendrian Knot and a travelling wave (VDM Verlag, 2008)
 Integrieren - do it yourself (in German, with Ursula Eisler and Daniel Zogg, Orell Füssli, 2010)
 Knots Unravelled: From String to Mathematics (with Andrew Jobbings, Arbelos, 2011)
 Analysis I and Analysis II (in German, with René Sperb, VDF Hochschulverlag, 2012 and 2015)
 Knopen in de wiskunde (Knots in mathematics, in Dutch, with Ab van der Roest, Epsilon Uitgaven, 2015)

References

External links
 Home page
 

Year of birth missing (living people)
Living people
Swiss mathematicians
Swiss women mathematicians
Alumni of the University of Warwick
Alumni of the University of Cambridge
ETH Zurich alumni
Academic staff of ETH Zurich
Mathematics educators
Topologists